Shuvosaurus (meaning "Shuvo's lizard") is a genus of beaked reptile from the Late Triassic of western Texas. Despite looking superficially similar to a theropod dinosaur, it is actually more closely related to crocodilians.

Discovery and classification
 
Shuvosaurus was described by Sankar Chatterjee in 1993 after it was discovered by his son Shuvo in the early 1990s. It was initially interpreted as a Triassic member of the Cretaceous dinosaur family Ornithomimidae because it had toothless jaws. Like the avian placement of Protoavis, the ornithomimosaur placement of Shuvosaurus was greeted with scepticism by others, and in their 1995 monograph on Late Triassic tetrapods from the American Southwest, Robert Long and Philip Murry considered Shuvosaurus to be possibly the same species as their new taxon Chatterjeea, which was based on 10 postcranial skeletons that had been previously referred to the rauisuchid Postosuchus by Chatterjee (1985), noting that the Shuvosaurus and the Chatterjeea material didn't overlap in terms of available material. For his part, Rauhut (1997, 2000, 2003) agreed with Long and Murry (1995) in questioning the ornithomimosaur placement of Shuvosaurus but classified it as a basal theropod. 

In the early 2000s, Sterling Nesbitt and Mark Norell prepared previously unopened jackets of an archosaur from the Whitaker Quarry at Ghost Ranch, which they named Effigia in 2006. This discovery showed that Shuvosaurus is more closely related to crocodilians, and that similarities between this animal and ornithomimids result from convergent evolution, while demonstrated that the taxon Chatterjeea was synonymous with Shuvosaurus.

References

Poposauroids
Late Triassic archosaurs of North America
Chinle fauna
Fossil taxa described in 1993
Prehistoric pseudosuchian genera